Eudonia hemicycla is a moth in the family Crambidae. It was described by Edward Meyrick in 1884. This species is endemic to New Zealand.

The wingspan is about 17 mm. The forewings are fuscous, with scattered pale ochreous-yellowish scales. There is a cloudy blackish spot on the inner margin near the base. Above this is a line of whitish scales. The hindwings are fuscous-grey, becoming dark fuscous towards the hindmargin. Adults have been recorded on wing in January.

References

Moths described in 1884
Eudonia
Endemic fauna of New Zealand
Moths of New Zealand
Taxa named by Edward Meyrick
Endemic moths of New Zealand